Slavestate is an EP by industrial metal band Godflesh. It was released in July 1991 through Earache Records. The EP saw the band experimenting with more samples and electronic sounds than their predominantly industrial metal prior releases.

Composition
With Slavestate, Godflesh sought to diversify their metal-dominated sound by introducing elements of dance music and electronic body music. Still, the music retained the harsh guitar and vocals of frontman Justin Broadrick, as well as the extreme aspects of Godflesh. Ira A. Robbins of Trouser Press wrote, "The four-song Slavestate EP finds the band charging full-on into an industrial-dance realm, giving Streetcleaner'''s lurch-and-crunch the twist of a rhythmic basis." The EP's title track contains a sample of the song "Stakker Humanoid" by Brian Dougans.

On Slavestate's shift in style, Broadrick said:

ReleaseSlavestate was initially released as a four-song EP.  A three-song remix EP titled Slavestate Remixes saw a limited vinyl release in September that same year. The remixes were later appended to all further issues of Slavestate.  The CD release also included the tracks from the follow-up "Slateman" single. In August 2009, Slavestate was reissued as part of a triple-CD package which also included the EP Cold World (1991) and the band's second studio album, Pure (1992).

Critical receptionSlavestate received lukewarm reviews, with the exception of the song "Meltdown", which was singled out as a highlight. Ned Raggett of AllMusic appreciated the change in pace from Godflesh's heavy, metal-focused music, but was ultimately unimpressed. Writing for The Quietus, Noel Gardner thought the introduction of electronic and dance elements was clunky but somewhat admirable. Broadrick was disappointed by the EP's contemporary reception, saying it "should have received far more acclaim than it did." In 1997, Metal Hammer'' retrospectively described the EP as "cutting edge".

Accolades

Track listing

Personnel
Credits adapted from liner notes.

Justin Broadrick – guitar, vocals, production
G. Christian Green – bass
Paul Neville – guitar
Machine – rhythm
Johnny Barry – layout

References

External links
 

Godflesh EPs
1991 EPs
1991 remix albums
Remix EPs
Earache Records remix albums
Earache Records EPs
Albums produced by Justin Broadrick